Stephen C. Williams is a retired United States Air Force major general who last served as the special assistant to the commander of Air Combat Command. Previously, he was chief of staff of United States Forces Korea.

References 

Living people
Year of birth missing (living people)
Place of birth missing (living people)
United States Air Force generals